Nonnegative  is the seventh studio album by Japanese rock band Coldrain. Recorded at Studio Barbarosa in Orlando, Florida with producer Michael 'Elvis' Baskette (who previously produced the band's predecessors, Fateless and The Side Effects), it was released on July 6, 2022 by Warner Music Japan.

Nonnegative is the third album by the band to be released by Warner Music and is the follow-up to 2019's The Side Effects. It was formally announced during the band's fifteenth anniversary live stream and was preceded by five singles. The album's lead single "Paradise (Kill the Silence)" was released on September 17, 2021, the second single "Calling" was released concurrently on the band's fifteenth anniversary on April 17, 2022, the third and fourth singles "Before I Go" and "Bloody Power Fame" were both released in June, the former being promoted as the campaign song for Sapporo Breweries latest product "Sapporo Beer Gold Star" while the latter was used as the opening theme for the Netflix anime Bastard!!. The fifth single "Cut Me" was dropped with an accompanying music video alongside the album in July 2022. The band released a total of twelve songs on the album, including a cover of No Doubt's 1996 smash hit "Don't Speak" on a record that spans a total runtime of just over 45 minutes.

Composition
Nonnegative has been described by critics as post-hardcore, metalcore, alternative metal, alternative rock, hard rock, electronic rock, and pop punk.

Track listing
All lyrics written by Masato Hayakawa, all music composed by Masato Hayakawa and Ryo Yokochi, except when noted.

Personnel
Credits adapted from album's liner notes.

Coldrain

  – lead vocals, composer, lyricist, arrangements, album artwork and design
  – lead guitar, programming, composer, arrangements
  – rhythm guitar, backing vocals, arrangements
  – bass guitar, backing vocals, arrangements
  – drums, percussion, arrangements

Additional personnel

 Michael Baskette – producer, mixing, arrangements
 Brad Blackwood — mastering (Euphonic Masters, Memphis, Tennessee)
 Jef Moll – recording engineer
 Daihei Yamanaka — recording engineer (Sakura Studio and Attic Studio Harajuku) 
 Joshua Saldate – assistant engineer
 Kentaro Tanaka – A&R
 Akihito Miyakoshi – A&R assistant
 Hikaru Ogasawara – sales promotor
 Manabu Okamoto – digital planner 
 Tadahi Matsuyama – package coordination
 Satoshi Kyojoh – general manager
 Tatsuro Watanabe – chief manager
 Kazuki Ozawa – artist manager
 Mai Sakamoto – desk
 Haruta – photography

Charts

References

External links
 
 
Nonnegative at YouTube (streamed copy where licensed)

2022 albums
Coldrain albums
Warner Music Group albums
Albums produced by Michael Baskette